The East Broad Street Commercial Building is a historic building in Columbus, Ohio. It was built in 1930 and listed as part of the E. Broad St. Multiple Resources Area on the National Register of Historic Places in 1986. The building has served numerous businesses, including doctor's offices, insurance agencies, and a Kroger store (1930-1946). Chinese restaurants operated out of the building from 1930 to 1995: Golden Lotus from 1930 to 1950 and Jong Mea from 1950 to 1995.

The East Broad Street Commercial Building exemplifies Jacobethan Revival structure. It is primarily constructed of brick on a concrete foundation. The gabled wood is made of slate.

See also
 National Register of Historic Places listings in Columbus, Ohio

References

Commercial buildings completed in 1930
Commercial buildings on the National Register of Historic Places in Ohio
1930 establishments in Ohio
National Register of Historic Places in Columbus, Ohio
Restaurants in Columbus, Ohio
Olde Towne East
Defunct restaurants in Ohio
Broad Street (Columbus, Ohio)